Matthew M. Maloney (born January 16, 1984) is an American former professional baseball pitcher.

Maloney played college baseball at the University of Mississippi, and was drafted by the Philadelphia Phillies in the 3rd round (97th overall) of the 2005 Major League Baseball Draft.

Career

Philadelphia Phillies
Maloney started his career in 2005 with the short-season class-A Batavia Muckdogs, where he pitched eight games and went 2-1 with a 3.89 ERA.

He spent all of 2006 with the Lakewood BlueClaws, and was the South Atlantic League's Most Outstanding Pitcher for the season. He was named a mid-season and post-season All-Star and was named a Low Class A All-Star by Baseball America. Maloney started 27 games for the BlueClaws and led the league in most categories, including wins (16 with 9 losses), ERA (2.03), complete games (2), shutouts (1), innings (168.2), and strikeouts (180). He had three 10-strikeout games and was named Phillies' Minor League Pitcher of the Year.

Maloney started the 2007 season in double-A Reading. He started 21 games for the double-A Phillies and was named a mid- and post-season All-Star for the Eastern League after posting a 9-7 record with a 3.94 ERA.

Cincinnati Reds
He was traded to the Cincinnati Reds on July 30 for starter Kyle Lohse. He started his Reds' tenure in double-A Chattanooga, where he started four games and went 2-2 with a 2.57 ERA. After the conclusion of the double-A season he was promoted to triple-A Louisville. He started three games for the Bats and was 2-1 with a 3.18 ERA. His 2007 totals for all three teams was 13-10 with 3.64 ERA in 170.2 innings (28 starts).

Maloney played the 2008 season at Louisville. He threw two complete games on the season and missed a no-hitter by two outs during the season. He spent nearly a month on the DL with a strained right oblique muscle (7/18 to 8/7), and made one rehab start for the Gulf Coast League Reds. He finished the season 11-5 with a 4.50 ERA in 25 starts. He tied Rico Beltran for second-most strikeouts in a season by a Bats pitcher with 132. Following the season, he was added to the Reds 40-man roster.

He played winter ball in the Venezuelan Winter League for Magallanes. He pitched six games and was 1-4 with a 3.42 ERA.

He started the 2009 season at Louisville again and started 10 games for the Bats with a 4-3 record and a 2.00 ERA. On June 6 he was recalled by the Reds to start against the Chicago Cubs. He allowed six hits and two runs while striking out four. He was in line for the win but the bullpen blew the one-run lead and the Reds eventually won 4-3 in 11 innings. He finished his first stint in the big leagues with an 0-2 record and a 6.11 ERA in three starts.

He was sent back down to Louisville on June 20 and started 12 more games, posting a 5-6 record and a 4.04 ERA. He was promoted again, and started against the Los Angeles Dodgers. He was sent back down, this time to double-A Carolina between the games of an August 30 double header, and pitched one game of relief (5.2 innings), getting the win. He was promoted with roster expansion in September to finish the year with the Reds. Although bothered by a blister on the middle finger of his throwing hand, he pitched much better in his third stint, going 2-1 with a 2.65 ERA.

As a batter over the season, Maloney enjoyed success. He hit .316 for Louisville with a homer and two RBI, and hit the homer off of future Pirates big-leaguer Daniel McCutchen. He also became the first Reds pitcher to get a hit in his first Major League plate appearance since Scott Randal in 2003.

For Louisville/Carolina he was 9-9 with a 3.00 ERA and 130 strikeouts. He was 2-4 for the Reds with a 4.87 ERA and 28 K's (his first being Ryan Dempster in his debut). Baseball America rated his control best in the organization following the season. He was the only left-hander to start for the Reds in 2009 and only the second in a 236-game stretch.

He was 10-7 with a 3.34 ERA in 24 games (23 starts) for Louisville in 2010. He struck out 104 in 134.2 innings.

For the Reds, he went 2-2 with a 3.05 ERA in seven games (two starts). He struck out 13 in 20.2 innings.

Minnesota Twins
On October 31, 2011, Maloney was claimed off waivers by the Minnesota Twins.

Boston Red Sox
On February 15, 2013, Maloney signed a minor league deal with the Boston Red Sox. Maloney spent the entire 2013 season in the minor leagues.

Somerset Patriots / Second stint with the Reds
Maloney pitched for the Somerset Patriots of the Atlantic League for most of the 2014 season. He had a record of 10-8 in 22 games started while registering a 3.40 ERA and 90 strikeouts in 137.2 IP. He was second team All Atlantic League starting pitcher. On May 21, 2014, Maloney signed a minor league deal to return to the Reds.

Sugar Land Skeeters
Maloney signed with the Sugar Land Skeeters of the Atlantic League of Professional Baseball for the 2015 season. He became a free agent after the 2015 season.

References

External links

 - Matt Maloney Stats, Bio on MiLB.com

1984 births
Living people
Arizona League Reds players
Baseball players from Ohio
Batavia Muckdogs players
Carolina Mudcats players
Chattanooga Lookouts players
Cincinnati Reds players
Minnesota Twins players
Gulf Coast Reds players
Lakewood BlueClaws players
Louisville Bats players
Lowell Spinners players
Major League Baseball pitchers
Ole Miss Rebels baseball players
Portland Sea Dogs players
Reading Phillies players
Rochester Red Wings players
Sportspeople from Sandusky, Ohio
Somerset Patriots players
Navegantes del Magallanes players
American expatriate baseball players in Venezuela
Sugar Land Skeeters players
State College of Florida, Manatee–Sarasota alumni